Peter Deakin (born 25 March 1938) is an English retired professional footballer who played as an inside forward in the Football League, most notably for Peterborough United and Bolton Wanderers. He later returned to Peterborough United as youth team manager and is a member of the club's Hall of Fame.

Career statistics

Honours 

 Peterborough United Hall of Fame

References

1938 births
English footballers
English Football League players
Brentford F.C. players
Living people
Sportspeople from Normanton, West Yorkshire
Association football inside forwards
Bolton Wanderers F.C. players
Peterborough United F.C. players
Bradford (Park Avenue) A.F.C. players
Nuneaton Borough F.C. players
Southern Football League players
Peterborough United F.C. non-playing staff
Footballers from Yorkshire